Diarmaid mac Madudan was Chief of Síol Anmchadha from 1032–1069.

Biography

Described as a rod who ruled each road, Diarmaid was the son of Madudan mac Gadhra Mór. He led the Madden clan in a plundering raid on Clonmacnoise in 1050. However, he became blind in old age and was killed by his nephew, Madudan, and succeeded by his son, Madudan Reamhar Ua Madadhan.

References
 O'Madáin: History of the O'Maddens of Hy-Many, Gerard Madden, p. 5, 8, 2004. .

People from County Galway
11th-century Irish monarchs